Hesperocranum is a genus of spiders in the family Liocranidae. It was first described in 1991 by Ubick & Platnick. , it contains only one species, Hesperocranum rothi, found in the U.S.

References

Liocranidae
Monotypic Araneomorphae genera
Spiders of the United States